Goldwin Smith (13 August 1823 – 7 June 1910) was a British historian and journalist, active in the United Kingdom and Canada. In the 1860s he also taught at Cornell University in the United States.

Life and career

Early life and education
Smith was born at Reading, Berkshire. He was educated at Eton College and Magdalen College, Oxford, and after a brilliant undergraduate career he was elected to a fellowship at University College, Oxford. He threw his energy into the cause of university reform with another fellow of University College, Arthur Penrhyn Stanley. On the Royal Commission of 1850 to inquire into the reform of the university, of which Stanley was secretary, Smith served as assistant-secretary; and he was then secretary to the commissioners appointed by the act of 1854. His position as an authority on educational reform was further recognised by a seat on the Popular Education Commission of 1858. In 1868, when the question of reform at Oxford was again growing acute, he published a pamphlet, entitled The Reorganization of the University of Oxford.

In 1865, he led the University of Oxford opposition to a proposal to develop Cripley Meadow north of Oxford railway station for use as a major site of Great Western Railway (GWR) workshops. His father had been a director of GWR. Instead the workshops were located in Swindon. He was public with his pro-Northern sympathies during the American Civil War, notably in a speech at the Free Trade Hall, Manchester in April 1863 and his Letter to a Whig Member of the Southern Independence Association the following year.

Besides the Universities Tests Act 1871, which abolished religious tests, many of the reforms suggested, such as the revival of the faculties, the reorganisation of the professoriate, the abolition of celibacy as a condition of the tenure of fellowships, and the combination of the colleges for lecturing purposes, were incorporated in the act of 1877, or subsequently adopted by the university. Smith gave the counsel of perfection that "pass" examinations ought to cease; but he recognised that this change "must wait on the reorganization of the educational institutions immediately below the university, at which a passman ought to finish his career." His aspiration that colonists and Americans should be attracted to Oxford was later realised by the will of Cecil Rhodes. On what is perhaps the vital problem of modern education, the question of ancient versus modern languages, he pronounced that the latter "are indispensable accomplishments, but they do not form a high mental training" – an opinion entitled to peculiar respect as coming from a president of the Modern Language Association.

Oxford years

He held the regius professorship of Modern History at Oxford from 1858 to 1866, that "ancient history, besides the still unequalled excellence of the writers, is the 'best instrument for cultivating the historical sense." As a historian, indeed, he left no abiding work; the multiplicity of his interests prevented him from concentrating on any one subject. His chief historical writings – The United Kingdom: a Political History (1899), and The United States: an Outline of Political History (1893) — though based on thorough familiarity with their subject, make no claim to original research, but are remarkable examples of terse and brilliant narrative.

He was elected as a member of the American Philosophical Society in 1865.

The outbreak of the American Civil War proved a turning point in his life. Unlike most of the ruling classes in England, he championed the cause of the North, and his pamphlets, especially one entitled Does the Bible Sanction American Slavery? (1863), played a prominent part in converting English opinion. Visiting America on a lecture tour in 1864, he received an enthusiastic welcome, and was entertained at a public banquet in New York. Andrew Dickson White, president of Cornell University at Ithaca, N.Y., invited him to take up a teaching post at the newly founded institution. But it was not until a dramatic change in Smith's personal circumstances that led to his departure from England in 1868, that he took up the post. He had resigned his chair at Oxford in 1866 in order to attend to his father, who had suffered permanent injury in a railway accident. In the autumn of 1867, when Smith was briefly absent, his father took his own life. Possibly blaming himself for the tragedy, and now without an Oxford appointment, he decided to move to North America.

Cornell years

Smith's time at Cornell was brief, but his impact there was significant. He held the professorship of English and Constitutional History in the Department of History at Cornell University from 1868 to 1872. The addition of Smith to Cornell's faculty gave the newly opened university "instant credibility." Smith was something of an academic celebrity, and his lectures were sometimes printed in New York newspapers.

During Smith's time at Cornell he accepted no salary and provided much financial support to the institution. In 1869 he had his personal library shipped from England and donated to the university. He lived at Cascadilla Hall among the students, and was much beloved by them.

In 1871 Smith moved to Toronto to live with relatives, but retained an honorary professorship at Cornell and returned to campus frequently to lecture. When he did, he insisted on staying with the students at Cascadilla Hall rather than in a hotel. Smith bequeathed the bulk of his estate to the University in his will.

Smith's abrupt departure from Cornell was credited to several factors, including the Ithaca weather, Cornell's geographic isolation, Smith's health, and political tensions between Britain and America. But the decisive factor in Smith's departure was the university's decision to admit women. Goldwin Smith told White that admitting women would cause Cornell to "sink at once from the rank of a University to that of an Oberlin or a high school" and that all "hopes of future greatness" would be lost by admitting women.

 
On June 19, 1906, Goldwin Smith Hall was dedicated, at the time Cornell's largest building and its first building dedicated to the humanities, as well as the first home to the College of Arts and Sciences. Smith personally laid the cornerstone for the building in October 1904 and attended the 1906 dedication. The Cornell Alumni News observed on the occasion, "To attempt to express even in a measure the reverence and affection which all Cornellians feel for Goldwin Smith would be attempting a hopeless task. His presence here is appreciated as the presence of no other person could be."

Toronto
In Toronto, Smith edited the Canadian Monthly, and subsequently founded the Week and the Bystander, and where he spent the rest of his life living in The Grange manor.

In 1893, Smith was elected a member of the American Antiquarian Society. In his later years he expressed his views in a weekly journal, The Farmer's Sun, and published in 1904 My Memory of Gladstone, while occasional letters to the Spectator showed that he had lost neither his interest in English politics and social questions nor his remarkable gifts of style. He died at his residence in Toronto, The Grange.

Political views
He continued to take an active interest in English politics. As a Liberal, he opposed Benjamin Disraeli, and was a strong supporter of Irish Disestablishment, but refused to follow Gladstone in accepting Home Rule. He expressly stated that "if he ever had a political leader, his leader was John Bright, not Mr Gladstone." Causes that he powerfully attacked were Prohibition, female suffrage and state socialism, as he discussed in his Essays on Questions of the Day (revised edition, 1894). He also published sympathetic monographs on William Cowper and Jane Austen, and attempted verse in Bay Leaves and Specimens of Greek Tragedy. In his Guesses at the Riddle of Existence (1897), he abandoned the faith in Christianity that he had expressed in his lecture of 1861, Historical Progress, in which he forecast the speedy reunion of Christendom on the "basis of free conviction," and wrote in a spirit "not of Agnosticism, if Agnosticism imports despair of spiritual truth, but of free and hopeful inquiry, the way for which it is necessary to clear by removing the wreck of that upon which we can found our faith no more."

Anglo-Saxonism
Smith is considered by historian Edward P. Kohn to be a "devout Anglo-Saxonist", a racial belief system developed by British and American intellectuals, politicians and academics in the 19th century. In his view, Smith defined the "Anglo-Saxon race" as not necessarily being limited to English people, but extended to the Welsh and Lowland Scots, though not the Irish. Speaking in 1886, he proclaimed that he was standing "by the side of John Bright against the dismemberment of the great Anglo-Saxon community of the West, as I now stand against the dismemberment of the great Anglo-Saxon community of the East." These words formed the key to his views of the future of the British Empire and he was a leading member of the anti-imperialist "Little Englander" movement.

Smith thought that Canada was destined by geography to become part of the United States. In his view, separated by artificial north–south barriers, into zones communicating naturally with adjoining portions of the United States, Canada was an artificially constructed and badly-governed nation. In his view, it would eventually break away from the British Empire, and the "Anglo-Saxons" of the North American continent would become one nation. These views are most fully developed in his work Canada and the Canadian Question (1891). Smith's views on the future of Canada–United States relations was criticised by Canadian priest George Monro Grant in the Canadian Magazine.

Imperialism

Smith identified as an anti-imperialist, describing himself as "anti-Imperialistic to the core". Despite this, he admired aspects of the British Empire; speaking on the topic of British rule in India, Smith claimed that "it is the noblest the world has seen... Never had there been such an attempt to make conquest the servant of civilization. About keeping India there is no question. England has a real duty there." Smith remained resolutely opposed to Britain granting more representative government to India, expressing fear that this would lead to a "murderous anarchy."

When the Second Boer War (1899-1902) broke out, Smith published several articles in the Canadian press and a book In The Court of History: An Apology of Canadians Opposed to the Boer War (1902) expressing his opposition to the war. Arguing against British involvement in the war on pacifist grounds, Smith's views were uncommon among the English Canadian community of the period. Smith published another anti-imperialist work in 1902, Commonwealth or Empire?, arguing against the United States assuming an imperialistic foreign policy in the aftermath of its victory in the Spanish–American War.

Antisemitism
Smith held strong anti-Semitic views. Described by McMaster University professor Alan Mendelson as "the most vicious anti-Semite in the English-speaking world", Smith referred to Jews as "parasites" who absorb "the wealth of the community without adding to it". Research by Glenn C. Altschuler and Isaac Kramnick has studied Smith's writings on Jews, which claimed that they were responsible for a form of "repulsion" they provoked in others, due to his assertion of their "peculiar character and habits", including a "preoccupation with money-making", which made them "enemies of civilization". He also denigrated brit milah, a Jewish ritual of circumcision, as a "barborous rite", and proposed either culturally assimilating Jews or deporting them to Palestine as a solution to the "Jewish problem".

Smith wrote that "The Jewish objective has always been the same, since Roman times. We regard our race as superior to all humanity, and we do not seek our ultimate union with other races, but our final triumph over them." He had a strong influence on William Lyon Mackenzie King and Henri Bourassa. He proposed in other writings that Jews and Arabs were of the same race. He also believed that Islamic oppression of non-Muslims was for economic factors.

In December 2020, the Cornell University Board of Trustees voted to remove Smith's name from the honorific titles of twelve professors at Cornell. The Board took this action in recognition of Smith's "racist, sexist and anti-Semitic" views. The Board declined to rename Goldwin Smith Hall.

Legacy
Goldwin Smith is credited with the quote "Above all nations is humanity," an inscription that was engraved in a stone bench he offered to Cornell in May 1871. The bench sits in front of Goldwin Smith Hall, named in his honour. This quote is the motto of the University of Hawaii and other institutions around the world (for example, the Cosmopolitan Club at the University of Illinois at Urbana–Champaign).

Another stone bench inscribed with the motto, sits on the campus of Boğaziçi University in Istanbul. It sits with a clear view down onto the city.

After his death, a plaque in his memory was erected outside his birthplace in the town centre of Reading. This still exists, outside the entrance to the Harris Arcade.

See also
 Irish question
 Jewish question

Notes

Works

 1861 – Rational Religion, and the Rationalistic Objections of the Bampton Lectures for 1858.
 1861 – The Foundation of the American Colonies.
 1861 – The Study of History.
 1863 – The Empire: A Series of Letters.
 1863 – On Some Supposed Consequences of the Doctrine of Historical Progress.
 1864 – Does the Bible Sanction American Slavery?
 1864 – A Letter to a Whig Member of the Southern Independence Association.
 1864 – A Plea for the Abolition of Tests in the University of Oxford.
 1865 – The Civil War in America.
 1865 – England and America.
 1865 – Lectures on the Study of History.
 1867 – Three English Statesmen.
 1868 – The Reorganization of the University of Oxford.
 1871 – The European Crisis of 1870.
 1878 – The Political Destiny of Canada.
 1880 – Cowper.
 1881 – Lectures and Essays.
 1882 – Great Britain, America, and Ireland.
 1883 – False Hopes: Or, Fallacies, Socialistic and Semi-socialistic.
 1885 – Temperance versus Prohibition.
 1886 – Dismemberment no Remedy: An address.
 1887 – Schism in the Anglo-Saxon Race.
 1888 – Keeping Christmas.

 1888 – A Trip to England.
 1890 – Life of Jane Austen.
 1891 – Canada and the Canadian Question.
 1891 – Loyalty.
 1893 – Essays on Questions of the Day.
 1893 – Oxford and Her Colleges.
 1893 – The United States: An Outline of Political History.
 1893 – Bay Leaves: Translations from the Latin Poets.
 1893 – Specimens of Greek Tragedy: Euripides.
 1894 – Specimens of Greek Tragedy: Aeschylus and Sophocles.
 1896 – Guesses at the Riddle of Existence, and Other Essays on Kindred Subjects.
 1899 – Shakespeare: The Man.
 1899 – The United Kingdom: A Political History.
 1901 – Commonwealth or Empire?
 1902 – In the Court of History.
 1903 – The Founder of Christendom.
 1904 – The Early Days of Cornell.
 1904 – Lines of Religious Inquiry.
 1904 – My Memory of Gladstone.
 1905 – Irish History and the Irish Question.
 1906 – In Quest of Light.
 1906 – Labour and Capital.
 1908 – No Refuge but in Truth.
 1910 – Reminiscences.

Articles

 "Has England an Interest in the Disruption of the American Union?," Macmillan's Magazine, Vol. X, May/October 1864.
 "England and America," The Atlantic Monthly, Volume XIV, Issue 86, December 1864.
 "President Lincoln," Macmillan's Magazine, Vol. XI, November 1864/April 1865.
 "The Proposed Constitution for British North America," Macmillan's Magazine, Vol. XI, November 1864/April 1865.
 "The University of Oxford," Harper's New Monthly Magazine, Vol. XXX, Issue 180, May 1865; Part II, Vol. XXXI, Issue 181, June 1865.
 "Richard Cobden," Macmillan's Magazine, Vol. XII, May/October 1865.
 "The Death of President Lincoln," Macmillan's Magazine, Vol. XII, May/October 1865.
 "An Englishman in Normandy," The Atlantic Monthly, Vol. XVIII, Issue 105, July 1866.
 "The Last Republicans of Rome," Macmillan's Magazine, Vol. XVII, November 1867/April 1868.
 "The Revolution in England," The North American Review, Vol. 108, No. 222, Jan. 1869.
 "War Under the Old Testament," Advocate of Peace (1847–1884), New Series, Vol. 1, No. 6, June 1869.
 "The Study of History," The Atlantic Monthly, Vol. XXV, Issue 147, January 1870.
 "The Ecclesiastical Crisis in England," The North American Review, Vol. 110, No. 226, Jan. 1870.
 "The Aim of Reform," The Fortnightly Review, Vol. XVII, 1872.
 "The Recent Struggle in the Parliament of Ontario," The Canadian Monthly and National Review, Vol. I, 1872.
 "The Woman's Rights Movement," The Canadian Monthly and National Review, Vol. I, 1872.
 "The Late Session of the Parliament of Ontario," The Canadian Monthly and National Review, Vol. I, 1872.
 "Alfredus Rex Fundator," The Canadian Monthly and National Review, Vol. II, July/December 1872.
 "The Labour Movement," Contemporary Review, Vol. XXI, December 1872/May 1873.
 "The Irish Question," The Canadian Monthly and National Review, Vol. III, January/June 1873.
 "What is Culpable Luxury?," Canadian Monthly and National Review, Vol. III, January/June 1873.
 "Cowper," Canadian Monthly and National Review, Vol. IV, July/December 1873.
 "Female Suffrage" Macmillan's Magazine, Vol. XXX, May/October 1874 (separately republished, 1875).
 "The Immortality of the Soul," The Canadian Monthly and National Review, Vol. IX, 1876.
 "The Decline of party Government" Macmillan's Magazine, 1877 (reprinted in Fleming, An Appeal for Essays on Rectification of Parliament (1892), p. 66)
 "Falkland and the Puritans: A Reply to Mr. Matthew Arnold," The Contemporary Review, Vol. XXIX, December 1876/May 1877.
 "The Labour War in the United States," The Contemporary Review, Vol. XXX, September 1877.
 "The Slaveowner and the Turk," The Contemporary Review, Vol. XXX, November 1877.
 "The Ninety Years' Agony of France," The Contemporary Review, Vol. XXXI, December 1877/March 1878.
 "England's Abandonment of the Protectorate of Turkey," The Contemporary Review, Vol. XXXI, December 1877/March 1878.
 "Can Jews be Patriots?," The Nineteenth Century, Vol. III, January/June 1878.
 "The Eastern Crisis," Eclectic Magazine, Vol. XXVIII, July/December 1878.
 "The Greatness of the Romans," The Contemporary Review, Vol. XXXII, May 1878.
 "Berlin and Afghanistan", The Canadian Monthly and National Review, Vol. I, December 1878.
 "The Greatness of England," The Contemporary Review, Vol. XXXIV, December 1878.
 "Is Universal Suffrage a Failure?," The Atlantic Monthly, Vol. XLIII, Issue 255, January 1879.
 "The Prospect of a Moral Interregnum," The Atlantic Monthly, Vol. XLIV, Issue 265, November 1879.
 "Pessimism," The Atlantic Monthly, Vol. XLV, Issue 268, February 1880.
 "Canada and the United States," The North American Review, Vol. 131, No. 284, Jul. 1880.
 "The Canadian Tariff," The Contemporary Review, Vol. XL, July/December 1881.
 "The Jewish Question," The Nineteenth Century, Vol. X, July/December 1881.
 "Has Science Yet Found a New Basis for Morality?," The Contemporary Review, Vol. XLI, January/June 1882.
 "Parliament and the Rebellion in Ireland," The Contemporary Review, Vol. XLI, January/June 1882.
 "The Machinery of Elective Government," The Nineteenth Century, Vol. XI, January/June 1882.
 "Peel and Cobden," The Nineteenth Century, Vol. XI, January/June 1882.
 "The 'Home Rule' Fallacy," The Nineteenth Century, Vol. XII, July/December 1882.
 "The Jews: A Deferred Rejoinder," The Nineteenth Century, Vol. XII, July/December 1882.
 "Why Send More Irish to America?," The Nineteenth Century, Vol. XIII, January/June 1883.
 "Evolutionary Ethics and Christianity," The Contemporary Review, Vol. XLIV, December 1883.
 "The Conflict with the Lords," The Contemporary Review, Vol. XLVI, September 1884.
 "The Fallacy of Irish History," Choice Literature, Vol. III, 1885.
 "The Organization of Democracy," The Eclectic Magazine, Vol. XLI, 1885.
 "The Expansion of England," Choice Literature, Vol. III, 1885.
 "The Administration of Ireland," The Contemporary Review, Vol. XLVIII, July/December 1885.
 "The Capital of the United States," Macmillan's Magazine, Vol. LIV, May/October 1886.
 "Election Notes," Macmillan's Magazine, Vol. LIV, May/October 1886.
 "England Revited," Macmillan's Magazine, Vol. LIV, May/October 1886.
 "John Bunyan," The Contemporary Review, Vol. L, October 1886.
 "The Political History of Canada," The Nineteenth Century, Vol. XX, July/December 1886.
 "The Moral of the Late Crisis," The Nineteenth Century, Vol. XX, July/December 1886.
 "The Canadian Constitution," The Contemporary Review, Vol. LII, July 1887.
 "The Railway Question in Manitoba," The Contemporary Review, Vol. LII, October 1887.
 "American Statesmen," Part II, The Nineteenth Century, Vol. XXIII, January/June 1888.
 "The Policy of Aggrandizement," The Popular Science Monthly, Supplement, 1888.
 "Shakespeare's Religion and Politics," Macmillan's Magazine, Vol. LIX, November 1888/April 1889.
 "The American Commonwealth," Macmillan's Magazine, Vol. LIX, November 1888/April 1889.
 "Prohibitionism in Canada and the United States," Macmillan's Magazine, Vol. LIX, November 1888/April 1889.
 "Progress and War," Macmillan's Magazine, Vol. LX, May/October 1889.
 "Canada and the Jesuits," Macmillan's Magazine, Vol. LX, May/October 1889.
 "Prophets of Unrest," The Forum, Vol IX, August 1889.
 "Woman's Place in the State," The Forum, Vol. IX, January 1890.
 "The Hatred of England," The North American Review, Vol. 150, No. 402, May 1890.
 "Canada through English Eyes," The Forum, May 1890.
 "A True Captain of Industry: Thomas Brassey," The Methodist Magazine, Vol. XXXI, January/June 1890.
 "A Moral Crusader," Macmillan's Magazine, Vol. LXII, May/October 1890.
 "The Two Mr. Pitts," Macmillan's Magazine, Vol. LXII, May/October 1890.
 "The American Tariff," Macmillan's Magazine, Vol. LXII, May/October 1890.
 "Exit McKinley," Macmillan's Magazine, Vol. LXIII, November 1890/April 1891.
 "Mr. Lecky on Pitt," Macmillan's Magazine, Vol. LXIII, November 1890/April 1891.
 "Will Morality Survive Religion?," The Forum, April 1891.
 "New Light on the Jewish Question," The North American Review, Vol. 153, No. 417, Aug. 1891.
 "Burke's Defence of Party" from the North American Review (1892) (reprinted in Fleming, An Appeal for Essays on Rectification of Parliament (1892), p. 151)
 "Party Government on Its Trial," The North American Review, Vol. 154, No. 426, May 1892.
 "The Contest for the Presidency," The Nineteenth Century, Vol. XXXII, July/December 1892.
 "Anglo-Saxon Union: A Response to Mr. Carnegie," The North American Review, Vol. 157, No. 441, Aug. 1893.
 "The Situation at Washington," The Nineteenth Century, Vol. XXXIV, July/December 1893.
 "Problems and Perils of British Politics," The North American Review, Vol. 159, No. 452, Jul. 1894.
 "Arthur Stanley," The Nineteenth Century, Vol. XXXV, January/June 1894.
 "The Impending Revolution," The Nineteenth Century, Vol. XXXV, January/June 1894.
 "The House of Lords: Reform by 'Resolution'," The Nineteenth Century, Vol. XXXV, January/June 1894.
 "Froude," The North American Review, December 1894.
 "Our Situation Viewed from Without," The North American Review, Vol. 160, No. 462, May 1895.
 "The Colonial Conference," The Contemporary Review, Vol. LXVII, January/June 1895.
 "The Manchester School," The Contemporary Review, Vol. LXVII, January/June 1895.
 "Guesses at the Riddle of Existence," The North American Review, Vol. 161, No. 465, Aug. 1895.
 "The Canadian Copyright Bill," The Canadian Magazine, Vol. V, 1895.
 "Christianity's Millstone," The North American Review, Vol. 161, No. 469, Dec. 1895.
 "The Manitoba Schools Question," The Forum, March 1896.
  "Is There Another Life?," The Forum, July 1896.
 "A Reply," The Canadian Magazine, Vol. VII, 1986.
 "The Brewing of the Storm," The Forum, December 1896.
 "A Constitutional Misfit," The North American Review, Vol. 164, No. 486, May 1897.
 "The Disintegration of Political Party," The North American Review, Vol. 164, No. 487, Jun. 1897.
 "Are Our School Histories Anglophobe?," The North American Review, Vol. 165, No. 490, Sep. 1897.
 "Not Dead Yet!," The Canadian Magazine, Vol. X, No. 2, December 1897.
 "Is the Constitution Outworn?," The North American Review, Vol. 166, No. 496, Mar. 1898.
 "The Origin of Morality," The North American Review, Vol. 167, No. 503, Oct. 1898.
 "The Moral of the Cuban War," The Forum, November 1898.
 "American Histories." In: Among My Books. New York: Longmans, Green & Co., 1899.
 "Imperialism in the United States," The Contemporary Review, Vol. LXXV, May 1899.
 "The Failure of Party Government," The Nineteenth Century, Vol. XLV, January/June 1899.
 "War as a Moral Medicine," The Atlantic Monthly, Vol. LXXXVI, Issue 518, December 1900.
 "The Last Phase of Napoleon," The Atlantic Monthly, Vol. LXXXVII, Issue 520, Feb 1901.
 "The Irish Question," The North American Review, Vol. 172, No. 535, Jun. 1901.
 "Wellington," The Atlantic Monthly, Vol. LXXXVII, Issue 524, June 1901.
 "The Political Situation in England," The North American Review, Vol. 173, No. 538, Sep. 1901.
 "The Age of Homer," The American Historical Review, Vol. VII, No. 1, Oct. 1901.
 "The Confederate Cruisers," The Independent, Vol. LIV, 1902.
 "A Gallery of Portraits," The North American Review, Vol. 176, No. 557, Apr. 1903.
 "Is Morality Shifting in its Foundation?," The Booklovers Magazine, Vol. I, No. 1, 1903.
 "Strenuous Life," The Independent, Vol. LV, 1903.
 "Mr. Morley's Life of Gladstone," Part II, The North American Review, Vol. 177, No. 565, Dec. 1903.
 "The Immortality of the Soul," The North American Review, Vol. 178, No. 570, May 1904.
 "English Poetry and English History," The American Historical Review, Vol. 10, No. 1, Oct. 1904.
 "City Government," The Independent, Vol. LVIII, 1905.
 "The Marquis of Dufferin and Ava," The Independent, Vol. LVIII, 1905.
 "The Treatment of History," The American Historical Review, Vol. 10, No. 3, Apr. 1905.
 "The Passing of the Household," The Independent, Vol. LIX, 1905.
 "Are We 'Re-Barbarized'"?, The Independent, Vol. LIX, 1905.
 "Burke on Party," The American Historical Review, Vol. 11, No. 1, Oct. 1905.
 "Is it Religious Persecution?," The Independent, Vol. LX, 1906.
 "The Impending Conflict," The Independent, Vol. LXI, 1906.
 "British Empire in India," The North American Review, Vol. 183, No. 598, 7 September 1906.
 "Chief-Justice Clark on the Defects of the American Constitution," The North American Review, Vol. 183, No. 602, 2 November 1906.
 "The Stage of Former Days," The Canadian Magazine, Vol. XXVIII, November 1906/April 1907.
 "Toronto: A Turn in its History," The Canadian Magazine, Vol. XXVIII, November 1906/April 1907.
 "The Church Question in France," The Outlook, 2 February 1907.
 "The Perils of the Republic," The North American Review, Vol. 184, No. 610, 1 March 1907.
 "Ireland," The North American Review, Vol. 185, No. 614, 3 May 1907.
 "Party Government", The Canadian Magazine, Vol. XXIX, No. 4, August 1907.
 "Evolution, Immortality and the Christian Religion: A Reply," The North American Review, Vol. 186, No. 623, Oct. 1907.
 "Magdalen College, Oxford," The Outlook, 14 September 1907.
 "Reform of the Senate," The Canadian Magazine, Vol. XXX, No. 6, April 1908.
 "The Religious Situation," The North American Review, Vol. 187, No. 629, Apr. 1908.
 "The Socialist Manifesto," The Canadian Magazine, Vol. XXXI, May/October 1908.
 "War," The Canadian Magazine, Vol. XXXI, May/October 1908.
 "Party Government," The North American Review, Vol. 188, No. 636, Nov. 1908.
 "Has England Wronged Ireland?," The Nineteenth Century and After, Vol. LXIV, July/December 1908.
 "The Crisis in India," The Canadian Magazine, Vol. XXXII, November 1908/April 1909.
 "Labour and Socialism," The Canadian Magazine, Vol. XXXII, November 1908/April 1909.
 "The American Civil War," McClure's Magazine, September 1910.
 "The Founding of Cornell University and His Introduction into Washington Society," McClure's Magazine, October 1910.
 "Last Words on Ireland," The Nineteenth Century and After, Vol. LXVIII, July/December 1910.
 "My Early Connection with London Journalism," The Canadian Magazine, Vol. XXXVI, November 1910/April 1911.

Miscellany
 
 
 "Letters of Goldwin Smith to Charles Eliot Norton", Proceedings of the Massachusetts Historical Society 49, October 1915/June 1916, pp. 106–160.

References

Further reading

 Adam, G. Mercer (1881). "The Press Banquet to Mr. Goldwin Smith, M.A." Canadian Monthly and National Review, Vol. VII, pp. 101–106.
 "Anglo-American Memories," New-York Tribune, 31 July 1910.
 "The Association and Mr. Goldwin Smith." In: A History of Canadian Journalism. Toronto: Murray Printing Co., 1908, pp. 76–82.
 Bell, Kenneth (1910). "Goldwin Smith as a Canadian," The Cornhill Magazine 29, New Series, pp. 239–251.
 Bell, Duncan (2007). The Idea of Greater Britain: Empire and the Future of World Order, 1860–1900 (Princeton, 2007), ch. 7
 Brown, R. Craig (1962). "Goldwin Smith and Anti‐imperialism," Canadian Historical Review 43 (2), pp. 93–105.
 Bryce, James (1914). "Goldwin Smith," The North American Review, Vol. 199, No. 701, pp. 513–527.
 Cooper, John James (1912). Goldwin Smith, D.C.L.; A Brief Account of his Life and Writings. Reading, Eng.: Poynder & Son.
 Dalberg-Acton, John Emerich Edward (1907). "Mr. Goldwin Smith's Irish History." In: The History of Freedom and Other Essays. London: Macmillan & Co., pp. 232–269.
 Gaffney, Patricia H. (1972). Goldwin Smith Bibliography, 1845–1913. Ithaca, N.Y.: Collection of Regional History and University Archives, John M. Olin Library.
 Gollancz, Hermann (1909). "Goldwin Smith's Essay 'On the Jewish Question'." In: Sermons and Addresses. London: Myers & Co., pp. 222–239.
 "Goldwin Smith, 'The Sage of the Grange'," The New York Times, 10 September 1905.
 "The Great Minds of America. I. Goldwin Smith," The North American Review, Vol. 186, No. 622, Sep., pp. 1–7.
 Gregory, W. D. (1910). "Goldwin Smith," The Outlook, Vol. 95, No. 17, pp. 950–959.
 Haultain, Arnold (1913). A Selection from Goldwin Smith's Correspondence. London: T. Werner Laurie.
 Haultain, Arnold (1913). "Why Goldwin Smith Came to America," The North American Review, Vol. 198, No. 696, pp. 688–697.
 Haultain, Arnold (1914). Goldwin Smith: His Life and Opinions. London: T. Werner Laurie.
 Hincks, Sir Francis (1881). "Canada and Mr. Goldwin Smith," The Contemporary Review 40, pp. 825–842.
 "History, Philosophy and Mr. Goldwin Smith," The North British Review, Vol. XXXVII, August 1862, pp. 1–34.
 Holland, Lionel R. (1888). Mr. Goldwin Smith and Canada. [S.l.: s.n.]
 Lang, Andrew (1900). "Scotland and Mr. Goldwin Smith," Blackwood's Magazine, Vol. CLXVII, pp. 541–550.
 Le Sueur, William Dawson (1882). "Mr Goldwin Smith on the 'Data of Ethics'," Popular Science Monthly 22, pp. 145–156.
  MacTavish, Newton (1910). "Goldwin Smith, the Sage of the Grange," Munsey's Magazine, Vol. XLIII, No. 5, pp. 680–683.
 Moses, Montrose J. (1910). "A Glimpse of Goldwin Smith," The New York Times, 18 June.
 "Mr. Goldwin Smith on the Study of History," The Westminster Review, No. 150, October 1861, pp. 157–180.
 Phillips, Paul T. (2002). The Controversialist: An Intellectual Life of Goldwin Smith. Westport, Conn.: Praeger.
 Spencer, Herbert (1882). "Professor Goldwin Smith as a Critic," The Popular Science Monthly 22 (1), pp. 18–20.
 Tollemache, Lionel A. (1911). "Jottings About Goldwin Smith." In: Nuts and Chestnuts. London: Edward Arnold, pp. 19–32.
 Trent, W.P. (1893). "Mr. Goldwin Smith on the United States," The Sewanee Review 2 (1), pp. 1–16.
 Wallace, Elisabeth (1954). "Goldwin Smith on England and America," The American Historical Review 59 (4), pp. 884–894.
 Wallace, Elisabeth (1954). "Goldwin Smith, Liberal," University of Toronto Quarterly 23, pp. 155–172.
 Wallace, Elisabeth (1954). "Goldwin Smith on History," The Journal of Modern History 26 (3), pp. 220–232.
 Wallace, Elisabeth (1957). Goldwin Smith: Victorian Liberal. University of Toronto Press.
 Wallace, Elisabeth (1969). The Grange and its Occupants: the Boultons and Goldwin Smith. Toronto: Education Dept., Art Gallery of Ontario.
 Wilson, Woodrow (1893). "Mr. Goldwin Smith's 'Views' on Our Political History," The Forum 16 (4), pp. 489–499.
 Underhill, Frank (1933). "Goldwin Smith," University of Toronto Quarterly 2, pp. 285–309.
 Wolf, Lucien (1881). "A Jewish View of the Anti-Jewish Agitation," The Nineteenth Century 9, pp. 338–357.

External links
 

 Obituaries: New-York Tribune, The Dial
 
 
 
 Works by Goldwin Smith at Hathi Trust
 Works by Goldwin Smith at Europeana
 Works by Goldwin Smith at The Online Library of Liberty
 The Cambridge History of English and American Literature: Goldwin Smith
 Biography at the Dictionary of Canadian Biography Online
 Goldwin Smith on War
 Goldwin's Myth
 Toronto's Historical Plaques: Goldwin Smith 1823–1910
 The St. George's Society and Mr. Goldwin Smith
Guide to the Goldwin Smith Collection circa 1860 at the University of Chicago Special Collections Research Center

1823 births
1910 deaths
Alumni of Magdalen College, Oxford
Antisemitism in Canada
Antisemitism in the United Kingdom
Cornell University Department of History faculty
English expatriates in Canada
English expatriates in the United States
19th-century English historians
English male journalists
Fellows of University College, Oxford
Members of the American Antiquarian Society
People educated at Eton College
People from Reading, Berkshire
Persons of National Historic Significance (Canada)
Presidents of the American Historical Association
Regius Professors of History (University of Oxford)
Burials at St. James Cemetery, Toronto